Alpargatas S.A. is one of the largest Brazilian manufacturing company in the footwears and canvass business.
Its main product is Havaianas, one of the largest Brazilian brands of rubber flip-flops, since 1962.

History 
It was founded in 1907, under the original name of Fábrica Brasileira de Alpargatas e Calçados, by Robert Fraser (from Scotland and Argentina), in association with an English company. Fraser had also established Alpargatas factories in Argentina and Uruguay.

It started production in the Mooca district of São Paulo (city). Already in 1909, the company - under the name São Paulo Alpargatas Company S.A. - found success in selling its products thanks to the use of sandals and canvas in coffee production.

In the 1930s, shareholding control of São Paulo Alpargatas was transferred to the Argentine company. However, in 1982, after a gradual process of nationalization of capital started in 1948, São Paulo Alpargatas ceased to have Argentine participation and passed to the control of the Camargo Corrêa group, its largest shareholder.

In October of 1999, it acquired more than 3% of Alpargatas Argentina, its former parent company, becoming the largest footwear company in South America, and in April of 2013 it bought all the shares of the Argentine subsidiary.

In 2012, Alpargatas updated its logo.
On November 2, 2015, Alpargatas sells the Topper and Rainha brands to group led by Carlos Wizard Martins for 48.7 million reais.

In November 2015, the Camargo Correa group sold Alpargatas to the J&F Investimentos conglomerate, owner of the JBS S.A. food company, for 2.67 billion reais.

On July 12 of 2017, the companies Cambuhy Investimentos and Brasil Warrant (both owned by the Moreira Salles family) and the Itaúsa holding purchased Alpargatas for 3.5 billion reais. The acquisition was approved by the Administrative Council for Economic Defense also in 2017.

See also
Associação Athletica São Paulo Alpargatas

References

External links 

Companies established in 1907
Shoe companies of Brazil